Dianelis Carbonell Lastre (born 27 July 1993) is a Cuban footballer who plays as a forward. She has been a member of the Cuba women's national team.

International career
Carbonell capped for Cuba at senior level during the 2018 CONCACAF Women's Championship (and its qualification).

References

1993 births
Living people
Cuban women's footballers
Cuba women's international footballers
Women's association football forwards